The 2009–10 Football League (known as the Coca-Cola Football League for sponsorship reasons) was the 111th completed season of the Football League. It began in August 2009 and concluded in May 2010, with the promotion play-off finals. The Football League is contested through three Divisions. The divisions are the League Championship, League One and League Two. The winner and the runner up of the League Championship will be automatically promoted to the Premier League and they will be joined by the winner of the League Championship playoff. The bottom two teams in League Two will be relegated to the Conference Premier.

The league was won by Newcastle United, with West Bromwich Albion as runners up. Both teams were promoted to the Premier League. Sheffield Wednesday, Plymouth Argyle and Peterborough United were relegated into League One. Grimsby Town and Darlington were relegated from the Football League. Attendance levels in the Football League in the 2009–10 season were the highest for 50 years, with 17.1m people paying to watch games in the three divisions.

Promotion and relegation

The following teams were either promoted or relegated for the 2009–10 season based upon the results of the previous year.

 From Premier League
 Relegated to Championship
 Newcastle United
 Middlesbrough
 West Bromwich Albion

 From Championship
 Promoted to Premier League
 Wolverhampton Wanderers
 Birmingham City
 Burnley
 Relegated to League One
 Norwich City
 Southampton
 Charlton Athletic

 From Football League One
 Promoted to Championship
 Leicester City
 Peterborough United
 Scunthorpe United
 Relegated to League Two
 Northampton Town
 Crewe Alexandra
 Cheltenham Town
 Hereford United

 From Football League Two
 Promoted to League One
 Brentford
 Exeter City
 Wycombe Wanderers
 Gillingham
 Relegated to Conference Premier
 Chester City
 Luton Town

 From Conference Premier
 Promoted to League Two
 Burton Albion
 Torquay United

Championship

Table

Play-offs

Results

Managerial changes

League One

Table

Play-offs

Results

Managerial changes

League Two

Table

Play-offs

Results

Managerial changes

References

 
2009-10
2009–10 in English football leagues